Victor Rochon (March 23, 1843 - November 15, 1892) was a merchant, public official, and state legislator in Louisiana. He served in the Louisiana House of Representatives representing St. Martin Parish from 1872 to 1874 and briefly in 1875 and from 1888 to 1890.

He was the son of Serile Rochon and Eliza Cadtille. He studied at Straight University.

Henry Louis Gates discussed the Rochon family history on a PBS show exploring Valerie Jarrett's ancestry.

See also
Charles Rochon
Etnah Rochon Boutte
List of Louisiana Creoles
African-American officeholders during and following the Reconstruction era

References

External links
Findagrave entry

1843 births
1892 deaths
African-American state legislators in Louisiana
Members of the Louisiana House of Representatives
People from St. Martin Parish, Louisiana
Straight University